United Nations Security Council resolution 808, adopted unanimously on 22 February 1993, after reaffirming Resolution 713 (1991) and subsequent resolutions on the situation in former Yugoslavia, including resolutions 764 (1992), 771 (1992) and 780 (1992), the council, after stating its determination to put an end to crimes such as ethnic cleansing and other violations of international humanitarian law, decided that an international tribunal should be established for the prosecution of persons responsible for serious violations of international humanitarian law committed in former Yugoslavia since 1991. This later became known as the International Criminal Tribunal for the former Yugoslavia.

The resolution then requested the Secretary-General Boutros Boutros-Ghali to submit, in no later than 60 days after the adoption of the current resolution, a report on specific proposals and options relating to the implementation of the decision to establish that tribunal, including whether it has a basis in law. At the same time, suggestions from member states would be considered, and after the adoption of Resolution 808, proposals were submitted by France, Italy and Sweden, amongst others. The tribunal would be fully established in Resolution 827 (1993).

See also
 Breakup of Yugoslavia
 Bosnian Genocide
 Bosnian War
 Croatian War of Independence
 List of United Nations Security Council Resolutions 801 to 900 (1993–1994)
 Yugoslav Wars

References

External links
 
Text of the Resolution at undocs.org

 0808
 0808
1993 in Croatia
1993 in Yugoslavia
1993 in Bosnia and Herzegovina
 0808
February 1993 events